The 2019 North Dakota State Bison softball team was an American college softball team that represented North Dakota State University during the 2019 NCAA Division I softball season. The Bison were led by Darren Mueller in his 18th season, and played their home games at Tharaldson Park. They competed in the Summit League, where they finished the season with a 42-16 record, also finishing 16-2 in conference play.

The Bison won the Summit League Tournament, and qualified for the 2019 NCAA Division I softball tournament. NDSU lost both games in the Minneapolis Regional, first to 12th ranked Minnesota and second to 25th ranked Drake.

Personnel

Roster

Coaching staff

Schedule

References 

North Dakota State Bison softball
2019 Summit League softball season
2019 NCAA Division I softball tournament participants